The 2014–15 Pakistan Premier League is the 60th season of Pakistan domestic football and the 11th season of the Pakistan Premier League. The league began on 20 September 2014. Khan Research Laboratories were the defending champions, having won the league championship for the last three seasons. 

The season also sees the league reduce to 12 teams from 16 after six sides were relegated in the previous season with two promoted.

Teams
Pakistan Navy, HBL, Baloch Nushki, Pak Afghan Clearing, ZTBL and Lyallpur were relegated at the end of the 2013–14 campaign. They were replaced by Baloch Quetta and Pakistan Railways.

Location and stadia

Final standings

Results

Season statistics

Scoring
Fastest goal in a match: 50 seconds – Zahid Majeed for Pakistan Airlines against K-Electric (30 September 2014)
First hat-trick of the season: Muhammad Asif for National Bank against Karachi Port Trust (30 September 2014)
Widest winning margin: 5 goals – Afghan Chaman 6–1 Baloch Quetta (2 November 2014)
Team with most goals scored: 43 goals – K-Electric
Team with fewest goals scored: 6 goals – Baloch Quetta
Team with fewest goals conceded: 7 goals – Pakistan Army
Team with most goals conceded: 64 goals – Baloch Quetta

Top scorers

Hat-tricks

4 Player scored four goals
Note: Baloch Quetta played with only 7 players on 2 November 2014 against Afghan Chaman, as most of the players returned home after losing several family members in 2014 Quetta Airbase attack, Pakistan Football Federation did not rescheduled the match, which earned them the negative criticism. Baloch Quetta lost the match 6–1.

Awards
Following is the list of annual award winners.

References

Pakistan Premier League seasons
1
Pakistan